The Trolls and the Christmas Express is a 1981 animated Christmas television special produced by the Canadian-based Atkinson Film-Arts. It was originally broadcast on HBO on December 9, 1981.

Plot
Six troublesome trolls, whose leader is called Troglo (voiced by Hans Conried), use their mischievous magic to sabotage Christmas by infiltrating Santa's village disguised as elves. After a week of wreaking havoc, but still not completely ruining Christmas, the trolls get a devilishly clever idea: on the day before Christmas Eve, they get the reindeer dancing and singing all night long. The next day, the reindeer are so tired that they cannot find the energy to pull Santa's sleigh. Although it is likely that Christmas is ruined, the elves quickly devise a plan to link the train from Santa's village with tracks that travel all over the world so that Santa can deliver the toys by using the Christmas Express.

Determined to stop this contingency plan, the trolls are forced to become ever more blatant in their sabotage until they are noticed. When Santa asks what their grievance is, the trolls complain they cannot stand the jolliness that seems to shut them out. At that, Santa points a certain fact when he has his elves sing "Deck the Halls" with particular emphasis on the word "troll" in the lyrics. At that, Santa and the elves explain that the verb, "to troll", means to sing or play in a jovial manner, and thus trolls have a place in Christmas. At this revelation, the trolls are so moved that they wish to make amends and agree to help the train make its delivery run.

Cast
 Roger Miller – Narrator
 Hans Conried – Troglo
 Paul Soles
 Len Carlson
 Billie Mae Richards
 Carl Banas

Songs and performers
"The Christmas Express" – composed by Hagood Hardy, performed by Roger Miller
"The Elves' Song" – composed by Hagood Hardy, performed by the Elves
"The Trolls' Song" – composed by Hagood Hardy, performed by the Trolls

Home media
The Trolls and the Christmas Express was released on VHS by Paramount Home Video in 1985 which has long been out of print. On August 12, 2008, it was released as a manufacture-on-demand DVD-R as part of the "Holiday Classics" series by Phoenix Learning Group, Inc.

See also
 List of Christmas films

References

External links

1981 television specials
Animated television specials
Canadian animated television films
Canadian Christmas films
Canadian television specials
Christmas television specials
HBO original programming
Films about trolls
Animated films based on Norse mythology
Santa Claus in film